Charles Lucas (1613–1648) was a Royalist general in the English Civil War.

Charles Lucas may also refer to:

Charles Lucas (cricketer, born 1843) (1843–1919), English cricketer
Charles Lucas (cricketer, born 1853) (1853–1928), English cricketer
Charles Lucas (cricketer, born 1885) (1885–1967), English cricketer
Charles Lucas (politician) (1713–1771), Irish politician and physician
Charles Lucas (Missouri lawyer) (1792–1817), Missouri lawyer
Charles Lucas (lawyer) (1803–1889), French lawyer and prison reformer
Charles Lucas (musician) (1808–1869), British cellist
Charles Lucas (sport shooter) (1886–1975), British Olympic shooter
Charles Lucas Anthony (1960–1983), one of the commanders of the LTTE rebel group in Sri Lanka
Charles Davis Lucas (1834–1914), Irish-born Royal Navy rear admiral and holder of the Victoria Cross 
Charles Prestwood Lucas (1853–1931), civil servant and historian
Charles Lucas (architect) (1838–1905), French architect and writer
 Red Lucas (1902–1986), MLB player born Charles Fred Lucas